Shir Kadeh (also Romanized as Shīr Kadeh; also known as Shīr Kandī) is a village in Dolfak Rural District, Khorgam District, Rudbar County, Gilan Province, Iran. At the 2006 census, its population was 242, in 59 families.

References 

Populated places in Rudbar County